The Ford Sigma is a small straight-4 automobile engine introduced in 1995 by Ford Motor Company. Its first evolution was sold as the Zetec-S (not to be confused with the trim level), then Zetec-SE and finally, in later years, renamed Duratec. The last upgrade of the engine is named Duratec Ti-VCT. Conceived for Ford's smaller models, the motor  was intended to replace the older HCS (a derivative of the even older Kent unit) and smaller capacity CVH units.

Introduction and production
As with the Ford Taurus SHO's SHO V6 engine, development of the Zetec-S was a collaborative effort between Ford, Mazda and  Yamaha. The engine's sounds were refined in the Ford acoustics center in Cologne-Merkenich, Germany. Production of the Zetec-SE was carried out in the Ford Valencia Engine Plant, with Yamaha building the 1.7 L engine blocks in Japan.

When the Zetec-SE first arrived in 1995, it included many firsts, such as a plastic inlet manifold, a "ladder" style main bearing and crankcase assembly, and big-end bearing caps which are forged in one piece and subsequently split. It also incorporates powder metal connecting rods, which were quite exotic and notable at the time.  This feature however makes the engine more challenging to rebuild at the end of its working life, since it is not possible to re-machine the bearing ladder as would be the case with a conventional cylinder block - the entire assembly has to be renewed.  Despite this however, engine tuners have found novel ways to increase the power of the unit through use of different valves and increasing the compression ratio of the engine through skimming of the cylinder head.

Difference between Zetec-SE/Zetec-S/Duratec/Duratec Ti-VCT

The Sigma engine was introduced under the Zetec-S name; after the upgrade it was renamed to Zetec-SE,  Duratec and Duratec Ti-VCT. The latest upgrade of Sigma is called Ecoboost 1.6 engine (Not to be confused with the smaller 1.0 or larger 2.0/2.3 engines)

Zetec-S/SE

Zetec-S

The  engines uses a heavily modified 1.4 L engine block and features Variable Cam Timing on the inlet camshaft. This displacement has only been used in the Ford Puma. A  version of this engine was developed for the Ford Racing Puma with only 500 units built.

Zetec RoCam
It is 8v SOHC instead of 16v DOHC and its block is made of cast iron instead of aluminum. Also, its camshaft is driven by a chain instead of a belt. As a result this engine exhibits rougher behaviour, producing more vibration and noise.

On the other hand, it has a superb torque output thanks to the addition of the RoCam (Rollifinger Camshaft) feature. It's also a much smaller engine than the SE version, which allowed it to be installed on the Ford Ka, replacing the Endura-E engine which by that time was considered underpowered and outdated.

The engine also featured a new patented process for the aluminum head production, which resulted in a better alloy than those produced in Spain and UK, and at a lower production cost.

In 2002 a supercharged 1.0–litre  version was released for the Ford Fiesta, to compete with the 1.0 Turbo 16v  version of the Volkswagen Gol.

In 2001 the Zetec RoCam engine was introduced in Europe, but labeled as Duratec 8v, for the Ka and Fiesta. Later a 1.6–litre version was also released for the SportKa and StreetKa. The European versions of the engine are produced in the South Africa plant.

In October/2004 a newer bi-fuel version was introduced labeled "1.6L Flex", capable of running on both petrol and ethanol, even mixed at any proportion. This version also featured a high compression ratio of 11.8:1 and "Compound High Turbulence" chambers, as used on the CHT engine.

Currently, this engine powers nearly all Brazilian Ford models – except those with 2.0 litre engines – in many different variants:
 101/106 hp 1.6L Flex (Ford Ka)
 65/68 hp 1.0L Flex (Ford Fiesta)
 105/111 hp 1.6L Flex (Ford Fiesta/ Fiesta Sedan), (Ford Focus), Ford EcoSport)

Applications
 applications:
 2003—2008 Ford SportKa 1.6,  and 
 2003—2006 Ford StreetKa 1.6,  and

Duratec
After an upgrade to the Sigma, Ford renamed it the Duratec.

Duratec Ti-VCT
The  Ti-VCT (Twin independent Variable Camshaft Timing) version includes variable valve timing, and generates more power and torque than non-VVT counterparts. Latest versions comply with the Euro5 emission level.

Crate engine versions
Crate engine versions of Zetec-SE engines are sold by Ford Power Products under the name ZSG Range.

Applications

Current use
The Ford Sigma engine is produced at Bridgend Ford in Wales, U.K. and at Taubate Engine & Transmission Plant, Taubate, São Paulo, Brazil. Today Sigma engines are used by Focus, Fiesta, C-Max and Mondeo. A  version is used by Morgan for their 4/4 Roadster since 2009, albeit coupled to a Mazda transmission driving the rear wheels.

1.25/1.4/1.6 L Sigma
These engines in the first generation Focus produced 75 and  respectively, but for MkII Focus the 1.4 variant was slightly modified and produced . Both engines have belt driven camshafts and Electronic Fuel Injection systems. They weigh . 
The 1.6 Ti-VCT was introduced in 2004, it features Variable Cam Timing; this  version is used in MkII Focus. A new / EU5 version is used in the MkIII Focus, also a 1.6 L  version is used in Ford Fiesta Zetec-S. The Sigma is usually coupled to the Ford IB5 five-speed manual transmission.

Brazil
Recently the Sigma engine was present in modern Brazilian versions of the Fiesta, Focus and Ecosport (1.6L TI-VCT version) and a 1.5 version was used by Ka. This engine was able to use the flex technology.

Power with ethanol:
 1.5L Sigma (non TI-VCT) - IB5+ manual transmission
 Fiesta (2014-2016) - 
 Ka (2014–Present) - 
 1.6 Sigma (non TI-VCT) - IB5+ manual transmission (both) and PowerShift (Fiesta Only).
 Fiesta (2008-2014) - 
 Ecosport (2012–Present) - 
 1.6 Sigma TI-VCT - IB5+ manual transmission and PowerShift.
 Focus (2013–Present) - 
 Fiesta (2008-2014) - 
 Ecosport (2012–Present) - 

In 2018 the Sigma engine was replaced in all Ford compact/subcompact cars  to the newer and stronger "Dragon" engine, displacing 1.5L with a 3-Cylinder layout and with a power output of 136HP.

Caterham usage
Some Caterham Cars use modified Ford Sigma engines such as the Caterham Seven 270, which uses a tuned Sigma engine producing  at 6,800 rpm as a modern equivalent to the original Ford Kent Crossflow engine used in the Lotus 7 from 1957 to 1972.
Ford Sigma 1.6-litre overview Technical features:
 a high level of running refinement and low emission levels
 aluminium alloy cylinder block and head
 cross flow cylinder head
 structural aluminium oil-pan for increased engine stiffness
 individual throttle bodies in place of the standard intake manifold
 twin overhead camshafts each with five bearings
 sequential multi-port fuel injection system
 long life, glass fibre reinforced camshaft drive belt with automatic tensioner
 state-of-the-art Twin Independent Variable Camshaft Timing (on Ti-VCT variant)

SCCA Spec Racer
The third generation of the SCCA Spec Racer, commonly known as the Gen3 was introduced in 2015, and uses the 1.6 L Sigma engine. The engine is sold by SCCA Enterprises as a sealed unit.

Zetec-E comparison
The Zetec-SE has no common parts or design with the larger Zetec-E engines apart from the name. This gives rise to some confusion since it suggests that they are members of the same family when they are, in fact, completely different. Zetec-E units are mounted transversely with the inlet manifold at the rear, whereas the Zetec-SE units are mounted with the inlet manifold at the front.

Replacement
In 2012 Ford replaced the Sigma engine with a brand new 3-cylinder 1.0–litre EcoBoost engine for some markets and models. The new engine provides more power and torque with less fuel consumption and lower  emissions.

See also
List of Ford engines

References

 

Sigma
Gasoline engines by model
Straight-four engines